Sam Sanders is an American journalist and radio presenter. He is the former host of NPR's It's Been a Minute, a weekly podcast and nationally broadcast radio program.

Career 
Sanders attended the University of the Incarnate Word and the Harvard Kennedy School. He joined NPR in 2009 as field producer and breaking news reporter. In 2015 he joined NPR's Election unit where he covered the Bernie Sanders 2016 presidential campaign and was one of the founding co-hosts of the NPR Politics Podcast. In 2017, he created and hosted a pop culture podcast and radio show at NPR, It’s Been a Minute.

After 12 years, Sanders left NPR in 2022 and joined Vulture where he hosts a pop culture podcast called Into It.

In August 2022, Sanders launched a podcast with Sirius XM's Stitcher called Vibe Check, focusing on "news and culture from a Black and queer perspective." The podcast is co-hosted by Sanders, Zach Stafford, and Saeed Jones.

Personal 
Sanders grew up in San Antonio. He is gay and has a partner.

References

External links 
 It's Been a Minute with Sam Sanders

Living people
African-American journalists
American LGBT journalists
NPR personalities
People from San Antonio
University of the Incarnate Word alumni
Year of birth missing (living people)
Harvard Kennedy School alumni